Huntington Bay is a village in the Town of Huntington in Suffolk County, on East Neck on the North Shore of Long Island, in New York, United States. The population was 1,425 at the time of the 2010 census.

History 
Huntington Bay incorporated as a village in 1924.

In 2000, the Village and the Huntington Yacht Club were involved in a legal dispute over proposals for added floating piers made by the latter party.

Geography

Demographics 

As of the census of 2000, there were 1,496 people, 539 households, and 454 families residing in the village. The population density was 1,456.4 people per square mile (560.8/km2). There were 560 housing units at an average density of 545.2 per square mile (209.9/km2). The racial makeup of the village was 98.46% White, 0.07% African American, 0.94% Asian, and 0.53% from two or more races. Hispanic or Latino of any race were 1.27% of the population.

There were 539 households, out of which 33.4% had children under the age of 18 living with them, 75.9% were married couples living together, 5.4% had a female householder with no husband present, and 15.6% were non-families. 12.6% of all households were made up of individuals, and 8.2% had someone living alone who was 65 years of age or older. The average household size was 2.78 and the average family size was 3.02.

In the village, the population was spread out, with 23.7% under the age of 18, 5.6% from 18 to 24, 18.9% from 25 to 44, 35.4% from 45 to 64, and 16.4% who were 65 years of age or older. The median age was 46 years. For every 100 females, there were 98.4 males. For every 100 females age 18 and over, there were 95.4 males.

The median income for a household in the village was $151,816, and the median income for a family was $163,820. Males had a median income of $100,000 versus $55,893 for females. The per capita income for the village was $71,798. None of the families and 2.0% of the population were living below the poverty line, including no under eighteens and 2.9% of those over 64.

Government
As of September 2022, the Mayor of Huntington Bay is Herbert Morrow and the Village Trustees are Barbara Beuerlein, Mark Dara, Jay Meyer, and Don Rave.

Village police 
The Village of Huntington Bay has its own police department, which provides the entirety of the village with police protection. The 2009-2010 police budget was $1,365,445.00.

References

External links
 Village of Huntington Bay official website

Huntington, New York
Villages in New York (state)
Long Island Sound
Villages in Suffolk County, New York
Populated coastal places in New York (state)